Bath Cricket Club Ground is a cricket ground in Bath, Somerset.  The first recorded match on the ground was in 1944, when Bath played London Counties.  In 1960 and 1963, the ground held Somerset Second XI matches in the Minor Counties Championship.

In 2007, the ground held two Women's Twenty20 Internationals matches, both between England women and New Zealand women.  The ground held its first, and to date, only Women's One Day International in 2008 between England women and India women.

In local domestic cricket, the ground is the home venue of Bath Cricket Club who play in the West of England Premier League.

References

External links
Bath Cricket Club Ground on CricketArchive
Bath Cricket Club Ground on Cricinfo

Cricket grounds in Somerset
Sports venues in Bath, Somerset
Sports venues completed in 1944
1944 establishments in England